The 2014–15 Polish Cup was the sixty-first season of the annual Polish football knockout tournament. It began on 19 July 2014 with the first matches of the Extra Preliminary Round and ended on 2 May 2015 with the Final, in which Legia Warsaw defeated Lech Poznań for a record 17th title. As winners, Legia qualified for the qualifying tournament of the 2015–16 UEFA Europa League.

Zawisza Bydgoszcz were the defending champions, having won their first title in the previous season, but were eliminated in the last 32 by Podbeskidzie Bielsko-Biała.

Participating teams

Source: 90minut.pl
Notes:
 Following the takeover of the I Liga team Kolejarz Stróże by Limanovia Limanowa, the club w decided to waive their spot in the Preliminary Round. The Polish FA ruled that the withdrawal is effective also for the First Round spot ceded to Limanovia by Kolejarz.
 Warta failed to register for the competition.

Round and draw dates 

Source: 90minut.pl

First Preliminary Round 
The draw for this round was conducted at the headquarters of the Polish FA on 26 June 2014. Participating in this round are 16 regional cup winners and 36 teams from the 2013–14 II Liga. The matches were played on 19 and 20 July 2014.

! colspan="3" style="background:cornsilk;"|19 July 2014

|-
! colspan="3" style="background:cornsilk;"|20 July 2014

|}
Notes
Note 1: Limanovia failed to register for the competition.
Note 2: Warta failed to register for the competition.

Second Preliminary Round
The draw for this round was conducted at the headquarters of the Polish FA on 26 June 2014. The matches were played on 26 and 27 July 2014.

! colspan="3" style="background:cornsilk;"|26 July 2014

|-
! colspan="3" style="background:cornsilk;"|27 July 2014

|-
! colspan="3" style="background:cornsilk;"|No match
|-
|style="text-align:right; background:#d0f0c0;"| Wisła Puławy (3)
|style="text-align: center; " colspan=2 rowspan=2|bye to the next round
|-
| style="text-align:right; background:#d0f0c0;"| Stal Rzeszów (4)
|}

First round 
The draw for this round was conducted at the headquarters of the Polish FA on 26 June 2014. The matches were played on 12 and 13 August 2014. Joining in this round are the 18 teams from 2013–14 I Liga.

|-
! colspan="3" style="background:cornsilk;"|12 August 2014

|-
! ! colspan="3" style="background:cornsilk;"|13 August 2014

|}
Notes
Note 1: Following the takeover of the I Liga team Kolejarz Stróże by Limanovia Limanowa, the club decided to waive their spot in the First Round.

Bracket

Round of 32 
The draw for this round was conducted at National Stadium, Warsaw on 14 August 2014. Participating in this round are the 16 winners of the first round along with the 16 teams from 2013–14 Ekstraklasa. The matches were played on 23, 24 and 25 September 2014.

! colspan="3" style="background:cornsilk;"|23 September 2014

|-
! colspan="3" style="background:cornsilk;"|24 September 2014

|-
! colspan="3" style="background:cornsilk;"|25 September 2014

|}

Round of 16 
Competing in this round are the 16 winners from the previous round. The draw for this round was conducted at National Stadium, Warsaw on 14 August 2014. Matches were played on 15, 28, 29 and 30 October 2014.

! colspan="3" style="background:cornsilk;"|15 October 2014

|-
! colspan="3" style="background:cornsilk;"|28 October 2014

|-
! colspan="3" style="background:cornsilk;"|29 October 2014

|-
! colspan="3" style="background:cornsilk;"|30 October 2014

|}

Quarter-finals
The 8 winners from Round of 16 competed in this round.The matches will be played in two legs. The first leg took place on 12 February, 3 and 4 March 2015, while the second legs were played on 5, 17, 18 and 19 March 2015.The draw for this round was conducted at National Stadium, Warsaw on 14 August 2014. 

|}

First leg

Second leg

Semi-finals
The 4 winners from the Quarterfinals competed in this round.The matches will be played in two legs. The first leg took place on 1 April 2015, while the second legs were played on 8 and 9 April 2015.The draw for this round was conducted at National Stadium, Warsaw on 14 August 2014.

|}

First leg

Second leg

Final
The Polish cup Final is being held at the National Stadium, Warsaw on 2 May 2015.

References

See also
 2014–15 Ekstraklasa

Polish Cup
Cup
Polish Cup seasons